Branka Zec (born 31 October 1986) is a Slovenian female handball player for VfL Waiblingen and the Slovenian national team.

She participated at the 2018 European Women's Handball Championship.

References

External links

1986 births
Living people
Handball players from Ljubljana
Slovenian female handball players
Expatriate handball players
Slovenian expatriate sportspeople in Germany
Frisch Auf Göppingen players